Top Country Albums is a chart that ranks the top-performing country music albums in the United States, published by Billboard.  In 2005, 21 different albums topped the chart, based on electronic point of sale data provided by SoundScan Inc.

In the issue of Billboard dated January 1, Shania Twain's album Greatest Hits was at number one, its sixth week in the top spot.  It remained at number one through the issue dated February 5, after which it was displaced by Kenny Chesney's Be as You Are (Songs from an Old Blue Chair).  Chesney was the only act to achieve more than one number one, as he would return to the top of the chart in November with The Road and the Radio.  Toby Keith spent the highest cumulative total number of weeks at number one in 2005, topping the chart for seven non-consecutive weeks with Honkytonk University.  The album's time at number one was interrupted by George Strait's Somewhere Down in Texas, which made Strait the first act to achieve 20 number ones on the Top Country Albums chart.  Somewhere Down in Texas also topped the all-genre Billboard 200 chart, as did both of Chesney's albums and Fireflies by Faith Hill.

Several acts reached number one on the Top Country Albums chart for the first time in 2005, including comedian Larry the Cable Guy, who spent four weeks atop the chart with The Right to Bare Arms, a live recording of one of his stand-up comedy performances.  The album entered the country chart despite consisting almost entirely of spoken-word performance rather than music; previous albums by the performer and other "redneck"-styled comedians such as Jeff Foxworthy and Bill Engvall had also been deemed eligible for the country albums chart.  Five other acts topped the chart in 2005 for the first time: Miranda Lambert with Kerosene in April, Dierks Bentley with Modern Day Drifter in May, Sara Evans with Real Fine Place and Gary Allan with Tough All Over, both in October, and Carrie Underwood with Some Hearts, which reached number one in December and was the year's final chart-topper.  Underwood had won the fourth season of TV singing competition American Idol earlier in the year, and Some Hearts, her debut album, would go on to be a major success, becoming the best-selling album of 2006 in the US.  Such was its enduring popularity that it was the biggest-selling country music album of both 2006 and 2007.  Miranda Lambert had also risen to prominence via a TV singing contest, having finished in third place on the first season of Nashville Star in 2003.

Chart history

References

2005
United States Country Albums